National Hockey Stadium may mean
 The National Hockey Stadium, Milton Keynes, a former national hockey stadium in England
 The National Hockey Stadium, Lahore, in Lahore, Pakistan
 The Malaysia National Hockey Stadium, in Kuala Lumpur, Malaysia
 The Ireland National Hockey Stadium at University College Dublin, Ireland